Ponometia is a genus of moths of the family Noctuidae. The genus was erected by Gottlieb August Wilhelm Herrich-Schäffer in 1868.

The Global Lepidoptera Names Index gives this name as a synonym of Acontia.

Species
 Ponometia exigua Fabricius, 1793
 Ponometia macdunnoughi Barnes & Benjamin, 1923 (alternative spelling Ponometia mcdunnoughi)
 Ponometia megocula Smith, 1900
 Ponometia sutrix Grote, 1880
 Ponometia tripartita Smith, 1903

Formerly Conochares
 Ponometia acutus Smith, 1905 (syn: Ponometia catalina Smith, 1906)
 Ponometia altera Smith, 1903
 Ponometia elegantula Harvey, 1876 (syn: Ponometia arizonae H. Edwards, 1878, Ponometia rectangula McDunnough, 1943)

Formerly Fruva
 Ponometia fasciatella Grote, 1875
 Ponometia hutsoni Smith, 1906
 Ponometia pulchra Barnes & McDunnough, 1910
 Ponometia vinculis Dyar, 1914

Formerly Tarachidia
 Ponometia alata Smith, 1905
 Ponometia albimargo Barnes & McDunnough, 1916
 Ponometia albisecta Hampson, 1910
 Ponometia albitermen Barnes & McDunnough, 1916
 Ponometia bicolorata (Barnes & McDunnough, 1912)
 Ponometia binocula Grote, 1875
 Ponometia bruchi Breyer, 1931
 Ponometia candefacta Hübner, [1831]
 Ponometia carmelita Dyar, 1914
 Ponometia clausula Grote, 1882
 Ponometia corrientes Hampson, 1910
 Ponometia cuta Smith, 1905
 Ponometia dorneri Barnes & McDunnough, 1913
 Ponometia erastrioides Guenée, 1852
 Ponometia flavibasis (Hampson, 1898)
 Ponometia fumata (Smith, 1905) 
 Ponometia heonyx Dyar, 1913
 Ponometia huita Smith, 1903
 Ponometia libedis Smith, 1900
 Ponometia margarita Schaus, 1904
 Ponometia marginata Köhler, 1979
 Ponometia mixta Möschler, 1890
 Ponometia morsa Köhler, 1979
 Ponometia nannodes Hampson, 1910
 Ponometia nigra (Mustelin, 2006) 
 Ponometia nigrans Köhler, 1979
 Ponometia parvula Walker, 1865
 Ponometia phecolisca H. Druce, 1889
 Ponometia semibrunnea H. Druce, 1909
 Ponometia semiflava Guenée, 1852
 Ponometia septuosa Blanchard & Knudson, 1986
 Ponometia tortricina Zeller, 1872
 Ponometia venustula Walker, 1865
 Ponometia virginalis Grote, 1881
 Ponometia viridans Smith, 1904

References

Acontiinae